Paradisi may refer to:

People

 Domenico Paradisi, Italian painter, active in Rome in the late 17th century
 Giulio Paradisi, an Italian film director, actor and screenwriter
 Pietro Domenico Paradisi, an Italian composer

Peculiars

 Indian paradise flycatcher (Terpsiphone paradisi) A bird that inhabits the southern Asian Continent.

Places
 Paradisi, Greece, a village on the Greek island of Rhodes
 Paradisi (Laconia), Greece, a village in the Greek municipality of Vatika